The Rhin is a  long river in Brandenburg, Germany, right tributary to the river Havel. It flows through the city Neuruppin and several lakes.

Rivers of Brandenburg
 
Rivers of Germany